Kim Young-jae (born October 5, 1975) is a South Korean actor. Kim began his acting career appearing in short films and bit parts, and while he later became best known as a supporting actor in mainstream film and television, he has also played leading roles in indies such as One Step More to the Sea (2009), Link (2011) and Suddenly Last Summer (2012), as well as the TV dramas Love Is Over (2006), Don't Hesitate (2009) and Three Sisters (2010).

Filmography

Film

Television series

References

External links 
 Kim Young-jae at Humane Entertainment 
 Kim Young-jae Fan Cafe at Daum 
 
 
 

1995 births
Living people
People from Gwangyang
South Korean male film actors
South Korean male television actors
Chung-Ang University alumni